Formal semantics may refer to:

 Formal semantics (natural language), the study of meaning in natural languages from a formal perspective
 Formal semantics or semantics of logic, the study of the interpretations of formal natural languages, usually the notion of entailment
 Formal semantics or semantics (computer science), the rigorous mathematical study of the meaning of programming languages